Tiffany Alexandra Brymer (born January 21, 1981) is an American former tennis player.

Born in Tarzana, Brymer won the USTA Girls' 18 National Championship in doubles partnering Abigail Spears, with whom she received a wildcard to compete in the doubles main draw of the 1999 US Open. The pair were beaten in the first round by 16th seeds Liezel Horn and Kimberly Po. From 1999 to 2003 she played tennis for the USC Trojans, where she was twice named All-American.

Brymer's brother Chris was an American football player with the Dallas Cowboys.

References

External links
 
 

1981 births
Living people
American female tennis players
USC Trojans women's tennis players
Tennis people from California
People from Tarzana, Los Angeles